Joseph Edouard Gaetjens (1924 – , 1964 [presumed]) was a soccer player who played as a center forward. Born in Haiti, he also played one match for Haiti in a World Cup qualifier against Mexico before switching to represent the United States national team in the 1950 FIFA World Cup, scoring the winning goal in the 1–0 upset of England. 

Gaetjens won his home national championship in 1942 and 1944 with top-level Etoile Haïtienne. He then moved to the American Soccer League (ASL) and led all players with 18 goals in 15 games for New York's Brookhattan during the 1949–50 season. He was posthumously inducted into the United States National Soccer Hall of Fame in 1976.

Gaetjens is among the Les 100 Héros de la Coupe du Monde ("100 Heroes of the World Cup"), which included the top 100 World Cup Players from 1930 to 1990, a list drawn up in 1994 by the France Football magazine based exclusively on their performances at World Cup level.

Early life 
Joe Gaetjens was born in Haiti's capital of Port-au-Prince, to Edmond and Antonine Defay, a well-to-do Haitian family who lived in an upscale neighborhood of Port-au-Prince called Bois Verna. His great-grandfather Thomas, was a native of Bremen, in northern Germany, who supposedly had been sent to Haiti by Frederick William III, the King of Prussia, as a business emissary arriving shortly after 1825; although the validity for this claim is uncertain by family members. He married Leonie Déjoie, whose father was a general in a time where Haiti's independence was officially recognized by France. The family was quite prosperous, and although by the time of Joe's birth their wealth had decreased significantly after the United States occupation of Haiti (1915–34), in which the economic isolation of Germany due to World War I and conflicts over family assets between sons took its toll on the family's business interests, they were still living among the Haitian elite. When Gaetjens was born, his father registered his birth certificate with the German embassy, in case he ever wanted to gain German citizenship.

Club career

Etoile Haïtienne
Gaetjens joined Etoile Haïtienne at the age of fourteen and won two Ligue Haïtienne championships in 1942 and 1944. In his first championship appearance, at the age of eighteen, came against longer established Racing Club Haïtien, another club in Port-au-Prince. Down 3–0 at halftime and a heckling goalkeeper directed at Gaetjens after each goal scored, "Ti-Joe" urged his teammates to hold its defense to allow no more goals. Less than ten minutes after Racing's last goal, Gaetjens rebounded and scored to break the shutout. At the 53rd minute, Fritz Joseph scored. With seven minutes remaining, Frérot Rouzier scored the tying goal equalizing the match at 3–3. At the final minutes of regulation, a defiant Gaetjens kept on the offense, breaking the tie at 3–4, which ended up being the game-winner. To this day, Racing Club Haïtien refuses to play matches on the "Jeudi Saint" (Holy Thursday); the day of washing of the feet. During his tenure with the club, he became known for his goal-scoring headers.

Brookhattan
Gaetjens went to New York City in 1947 to study accounting at Columbia University on a scholarship from the Haitian government and concluded that he could not make a living from professional soccer in Haiti. During this time, he played three seasons for Brookhattan of the American Soccer League (ASL). In his first season during 1947–48, he scored the second-most goals in the league with 14. In his third season, he won the league's scoring title totaling 18 goals in 15 games during 1949–50. He was making $25 per game, while also working for the Brookhattan owner's restaurant and washing dishes.

Racing Club de Paris and Olympique Alès
At the end of the World Cup, Gaetjens left for France to play in Division 1, where he briefly played for Racing Club de Paris; scoring twice in four games and then for Division 2 Olympique Alès; scoring twice in fifteen games.

Etoile Haïtienne
Gaetjens returned to Haiti in 1954 and remained active in soccer, rejoining Etoile Haïtienne, and also became a spokesman for Colgate-Palmolive. He played a few seasons and then left the game for good in 1957, a few months after the birth of his first son.

International career

Haiti
Gaetjens debuted on the international scene on April 2, 1944, for the Haiti national team, losing to Curaçao, 0–5. In the following match on April 5, 1944, against Venezuela, the Haitian team was shut out 0–2. Both matches were friendlies.

United States
His success with Brookhattan attracted the attention of U.S. Soccer, and Gaetjens made the national team for the 1950 World Cup.

Gaetjens played three games at the World Cup, including one of the greatest World Cup upsets in history, in which Gaetjens scored the only goal in a 1–0 victory in which the American soccer team defeated the hugely favored English at Belo Horizonte. Walter Bahr had taken a shot from about 25 yards away and the ball was heading to goalkeeper Bert Williams's right. It appeared to be a relatively easy save, but Gaetjens dove headlong and grazed the ball enough that it went to the goalkeeper's left instead, with his momentum preventing him from stopping the ball. Williams later considered the goal to be a result of a lucky deflection, but this view was disputed by Laurie Hughes, who was defending Gaetjens on the play.

Although Gaetjens was not a United States citizen, he had declared his intention of becoming one, and under the rules of the United States Soccer Football Association at that time was allowed to play. However, Gaetjens never actually did gain American citizenship.

Return to Haiti
On December 27, 1953, Gaetjens played in a World Cup Qualifier for Haiti against Mexico.

Death and legacy 
Gaetjens was not interested in politics, but his family was. He was related to Louis Déjoie (his great-grandfather Thomas married Leonie Déjoie), who lost the 1957 Haitian presidential election to François "Papa Doc" Duvalier, and although the family also had connections to the new president, Gaetjens's younger brothers Jean-Pierre and Fred, became associated with a group of exiles in the Dominican Republic who wanted to stage a coup.

On , 1964, the morning after Duvalier declared himself "president for life", the rest of the Gaetjens family fled the country in fear of reprisal for the younger Gaetjens brothers' rebellious associations, but Joe stayed, thinking that Duvalier's regime would be uninterested in him since he was only a sports figure. That morning, he was arrested by the nation's Tonton Macoutes secret police and was taken to a prison called Fort Dimanche notorious for its brutally inhumane practices, where it is presumed he was killed some time later that month. His body has never been found.

In 1972, Gaetjens was honored in a benefit game involving the New York Cosmos and a team composed of local Haitians at Yankee Stadium. Joe Gaetjens was posthumously inducted into the United States National Soccer Hall of Fame in 1976.

In 2010, his son Lesly Gaetjens wrote a biography about his father: The Shot Heard Around the World: The Joe Gaetjens Story.

Number search

The jersey number worn by Gaetjens during the 1950 World Cup match against England remains unknown, with several accounts from family members and historians unable to verify various claims. The number was not recorded in an official match report; the National Soccer Hall of Fame stated the number was 18 and cited Walter Bahr, but he was unable to verify the claim. An unnamed ESPN producer for "Outside the Lines" who worked with footage of the match for a special dedicated to Gaetjens stated to an ESPN journalist that they were "98 or 99 percent sure" that the number was 18.

Film controversy
Gaetjens, although light-skinned, was portrayed by "dark-skinned" Haitian actor Jimmy Jean-Louis in the 2005 film The Game of Their Lives. He was also depicted as a practitioner of Voodoo, which outraged his family, leading them to proclaim how ludicrously inaccurate the interpretation was. In reality, Gaetjens, like most Haitians, grew up as a Catholic and went to church every Sunday. His sister, Mireille, voiced her displeasure and condemned the notion over a phone interview by saying: "Our family traded rum and coffee and ran schools... No family member was into voodoo. I've never even seen voodoo being practiced. Nobody in the family has ever even set foot in a voodoo church!"

Personal life
When Gaetjens first arrived in the US from Haiti, he was mistaken for Belgian of the Flemish-speaking part of the country, due to the sounding of his surname ending in -tjens and the fact that migration in waves from Belgium were common during the 19th century. However, his great-grandfather was from Bremen of northern Germany and the Gaetjens name is not common in Flanders. Although, a variant does exist over Germany's northern border in Denmark as Gätjens.

Gaetjens was a fluent speaker of French, Spanish and English.

Honors

Club

Etoile Haïtienne
Ligue Haïtienne: 1942, 1944

Brookhattan
Runner-up National Challenge Cup: 1948

Individual
Inducted into the United States National Soccer Hall of Fame: 1976
France Football: World Cup Top-100 1930–1990
NSCAA Honorary All-America Award: 2015

Performances
 ASL Golden Boot: 1950

Career statistics

References

Notes

Citations

External links

1924 births
1964 deaths
Sportspeople from Port-au-Prince
Haitian footballers
Haiti international footballers
American soccer players
United States men's international soccer players
Columbia University alumni
Haitian expatriate sportspeople in France
Haitian expatriate sportspeople in the United States
Haitian Roman Catholics
Haitian people of German descent
New York Brookhattan players
Expatriate soccer players in the United States
American Soccer League (1933–1983) players
1950 FIFA World Cup players
Haitian expatriate footballers
Dual internationalists (football)
National Soccer Hall of Fame members
Expatriate footballers in France
Ligue 1 players
Racing Club de France Football players
Ligue 2 players
Olympique Alès players
Extrajudicial killings
Haitian murder victims
People murdered in Haiti
Association football forwards